The West Virginia Governor's Stakes is a Grade III American thoroughbred horse race for horses aged three years old and older over a distance of one and one-sixteenth miles on the dirt held annually in August at Mountaineer Race Track in Chester, West Virginia.  The event currently carries a purse of $150,000.

History

The inaugural running of the event was on 8 September 1995 as the first race on a nine race program on the West Virginia Breeders Classic Stakes Day. The event was run as the West Virginia Governor's Cup Handicap over a five furlong distance.

The event was not held in 1996.  In 1997 the event was run as the West Virginia Governor's Handicap over a distance of  miles and was the main event of the day's racing card.

In 2005 the conditions of the event were changed from handicap to stakes allowance and the name of the event was modified to the West Virginia Governor's Stakes.

In 2007 the event was won by the eight-year-old M B Sea for the second time. Both of the victories by M B Sea were by seven lengths which stood as the margin record until Shadowbdancing won by eight lengths in 2009.

Joan & Ron Winchell, who race as Winchell Thoroughbreds, won this race in 2012 with Tapizar and went on to win the Breeders' Cup Dirt Mile in the fall.

In 2015, the race saw a major upset when longshot Looks To Spare won under jockey Deshawn Parker. A perennial Mountaineer Racetrack champion and its all-time winningest jockey, when Parker rides it is near automatic that the fans will heavily back him. However, Looks To Spare was considered such an unlikely winner that he was allowed to go off at odds of 74–1. He paid $150.60 to win on a $2 ticket.

The race has grown in stature over the years and in 2018 the race was upgraded by the Thoroughbred Owners and Breeders Association to Grade 3 status.  
 
In 2020 due to the COVID-19 pandemic in the United States, Mountaineer Park canceled the event.

Records
Speed record: 
  miles - 1:41.15 Be Like Mike  (2003)

Margins:
 8 lengths  -  Shadowbdancing (2009)

Most wins:
 2 - M B Sea (2005, 2007)

Most wins by a jockey:
 2 - Rafael Bejarano (2004, 2011)

Most wins by a trainer:
 3 - Brad H. Cox (2014, 2018, 2022)

Most wins by an owner:
 2 - Michael J. Bruder (2005, 2007) 
 2 - Winchell Thoroughbreds (2008, 2012)

Winners

See also
List of American and Canadian Graded races

References

Graded stakes races in the United States
Grade 3 stakes races in the United States
Horse races in the United States
Open mile category horse races
Recurring sporting events established in 1995
Sports in West Virginia
1995 establishments in West Virginia